The Piaggio P.16 was an Italian heavy bomber designed and built by Piaggio for the Regia Aeronautica (Italian Royal Air Force).

Design and development
The P.16 was a three-engine shoulder-wing monoplane of mostly metal construction, with inverted gull wings. Its wing was thick and semi-elliptical, and its tail was mounted high on the fuselage. It had retractable main landing gear and a spatted, non-retractable tailwheel. In addition to bombs, its armament consisted of four 7.62-millimeter (0.3-inch) machine guns, of which two were mounted in the leading edge of the wing, one in a retractable dorsal turret, and one in the rear of the fuselage beneath the tail. The bombardier (bomb-aimer) manned a compartment set behind the nose engine on the underside of the fuselage.

Operational history
The P.16 first flew in November 1934, and an order for 12 aircraft was placed and then cancelled, with preference given to the Piaggio P.32, which was produced from 1936 to 1939.

Operators

Regia Aeronautica

Specifications

References

External links

http://www.flightglobal.com/pdfarchive/view/1936/1936%20-%200073.html

P.016
1930s Italian bomber aircraft
Trimotors
Shoulder-wing aircraft
Aircraft first flown in 1934
Inverted gull-wing aircraft